Hyblaea esakii is a moth in the family Hyblaeidae described by Shigero Sugi in 1958.

References

Hyblaeidae